William R. Flagg (born March 11, 1934) is an American country and rockabilly singer, who was the first to use the term rockabilly.

Life

Childhood and youth 

Bill Flagg was born and raised in Waterville, Maine. Shortly after the start of World War II, the family moved to Connecticut.

Career 
Flagg began his career in radio as a "singing cowboy" calling himself The Lone Pine Cowboy. He then moved to bluegrass before he and his friend, John Sligar, changed to rockabilly in 1954. Flagg is the first musician known to use this term. The musical style as such had already existed and had been played by musicians such as Hardrock Gunter and Roy Hall. Because of his rising popularity on the radio, he got a recording contract with Tetra Records in New York City. With his band members, Cat Gibson and Ted Barton, henceforth calling themselves The Rockabillies, Flagg recorded his first record in 1956, Howie Stange. The first singles, including Go Cat Go and Guitar Rock, recorded with a contrabass and two acoustic guitars, did not show on the Billboard charts. The records were marketed as "rockabillie" by Tetra.

In 1958, Flagg changed to MGM Records and released his last single. After that, he worked in his family's business and helped his father, who had previously suffered a heart attack. He only appeared in bars on weekends. Twenty-seven years after his musical career, his son, Bob, persuaded him to actively join the music scene again. After that, Flagg started a bluegrass band called Hobo Bill and the Last Ride. Since then, Bill Flagg has again been making appearances in the public.

Discography

References

External links 
 Biography
 Discography with audio samples

1934 births
American country singer-songwriters
American rockabilly musicians
Singers from Maine
Living people
People from Waterville, Maine
20th-century American singers
Singer-songwriters from New York (state)
Songwriters from Maine
Country musicians from Connecticut
Singer-songwriters from Connecticut